The 2002 United States Senate elections featured a series of fiercely contested elections that resulted in a victory for the Republican Party, which gained two seats and thus a narrow majority from the Democratic Party in the United States Senate. The Senate seats up for election, known as class 2 Senate seats, were last up for regular election in 1996. The election was held on November 5, 2002, almost fourteen months after the September 11, 2001 attacks.

The Democrats had originally hoped to do well, as the party holding the presidency historically loses seats in midterm elections, and additionally, the Republicans had 20 seats up for election compared to 14 Democratic seats up for election. In addition, the Republicans had five open seats, while the Democrats and the Independence Party of Minnesota had one each. However, the Republicans were able to hold their five open seats and pick up the one that was held by the IPM, while the Democrats held their only open seat. Ultimately, Republicans would pick up three seats and lose one, resulting in a net gain of two seats. Together with gains made in the House of Representatives, this election was one of three mid-term elections in which the party in control of the White House did not lose Congressional seats (the others were 1934 and 1998). 

Trent Lott led the Senate Republicans through this election cycle and was due to become the new Senate Majority Leader upon the retaking of control of the Senate by the Republicans. However, his controversial praise for Strom Thurmond's 1948 segregationist Dixiecrat presidential campaign at Thurmond's 100th birthday celebration led to Lott's stepping-down from Senate leadership, and resulted in Tennessee Republican Bill Frist being selected as the new Senate Majority Leader instead.

This was the only election cycle ever where the party of the incumbent president gained new control of a house of Congress in a midterm election. This is also the last midterm election where the party controlling the White House flipped a senate seat in a state they did not win in the preceding presidential election (in this case, Minnesota). , this was the last Senate election cycle where Republicans won Senate elections in Minnesota, New Mexico, Oregon, and Virginia.

Gains and losses 

Republicans defeated incumbent Democratic Senators Max Cleland of Georgia, and Jean Carnahan of Missouri, while incumbent Republican Tim Hutchinson of Arkansas lost to Democrat Mark Pryor. Democrat Paul Wellstone of Minnesota was running for re-election, but he died in a plane crash shortly before the election and his seat was won by a Republican.

Results summary

Source: Clerk of the U.S. House of Representatives

Change in composition

Before the elections 
After the death of Paul Wellstone on October 25, 2002 and the appointment of Minnesota on November 4.

After the elections

Retirements and defeats

Retirements
One Independent and four Republicans decided to retire instead of seeking re-election.

 Minnesota: Dean Barkley (IPM) was not a candidate in the election. Barkley had been appointed in the seat following the death of the previous holder, Paul Wellstone (D), in the middle of a tough fight against former St. Paul Mayor Norm Coleman. Most observers expected that this would lead to a sympathy boost for his replacement, liberal stalwart and former Vice President Walter Mondale, but his campaign received negative press after Wellstone's funeral was marked by political speeches.
 North Carolina: Jesse Helms (R)
 South Carolina: Strom Thurmond (R)
 Tennessee: Fred Thompson (R)
 Texas: Phil Gramm (R)

Defeats
One Democrat and one Republican sought re-election but lost in the general election, that included an interim appointee also sought for election to finish the term. One Republican ran for re-election but lost in the primary.

 Arkansas:  Tim Hutchinson (R), who was personally unpopular due to him divorcing his wife and marrying a young staffer, was defeated by Democratic challenger Mark Pryor, Arkansas Attorney General and the son of David Pryor, former Senator and Governor.
 Georgia: Max Cleland (D), a Vietnam War veteran and triple amputee, was defeated by Representative Saxby Chambliss in a tough campaign marked by attacks on Cleland's stance on a Department of Homeland Security. Despite Cleland being a combat veteran, Chambliss won the support of the organization Veterans of Foreign Wars.
 Missouri: Jean Carnahan (D), had been appointed to the Senate after her husband, Mel Carnahan, had narrowly won the 2000 election posthumously. His wife was unable to hold the seat, losing narrowly to former Congressman Jim Talent.
 New Hampshire: Bob Smith (R), lost in the Republican primary to Representative John E. Sununu, who later won the general election.

Race summary

Special elections during the 107th Congress 
In these special elections, the winner was seated in the fall of 2002; ordered by election date, then state.

Elections leading to the next Congress 
In these general elections, the winners were elected for the term beginning January 3, 2003; ordered by state.

All of the elections involved the Class 2 seats.

Closest races
In eleven races the margin of victory was under 10%

Alabama 

Since around 1980, Alabama voters had increasingly voted for Republican candidates at the federal level, especially in Presidential elections. By contrast, Democratic candidates had been elected to many state-level offices and comprised a longstanding majority in the Alabama Legislature.

Incumbent Republican Jeff Sessions was not challenged in the primary, and easily won re-election to a second term.

Sessions was not challenged in the primary.

McPhillips received a large amount of support in the southern part of the state, but Parker won the most votes. Sowell endorsed Parker for the run-off.

Alaska 

Incumbent Ted Stevens ran for and won a seventh term. He faced perennial candidate Frank Vondersaar, the Democratic nominee, journalist Jim Sykes, the Green Party nominee, and several other independent candidates in his bid for re-election. Ultimately, Stevens crushed his opponents to win what would be his last term in the Senate, allowing him to win with the largest margin of victory for any Senate election in Alaska, as well as the highest percentage of the vote in any of his elections.

Arkansas 

Incumbent Republican Tim Hutchinson ran for a second term, but lost re-election to Arkansas Attorney General Mark Pryor.

Colorado 

Incumbent Republican Wayne Allard won re-election to a second term.

Delaware 

Incumbent Democrat Joe Biden won re-election to a sixth term.

Georgia 

Incumbent Democrat Max Cleland ran for re-election to a second term, but lost to Republican Saxby Chambliss.

Chambliss's campaign used the refrain of national defense and security, but drew criticism for television ads that paired images of Cleland and Osama bin Laden and Saddam Hussein, and for questioning the commitment to homeland security of his opponent, a triple amputee and decorated Vietnam veteran. Republican Senator John McCain of Arizona said of one ad: "It's worse than disgraceful. It's reprehensible." McCain, along with Republican Senator Chuck Hagel of Nebraska, made significant complaints to the Republican National Committee until the ads were taken down. Nevertheless, Chambliss defeated Cleland by nearly seven percentage points.

Idaho 

Incumbent Republican Larry Craig won re-election to a third term.

Illinois 

Incumbent Democrat Dick Durbin won re-election to a second term. Durbin faced off against State Representative and future Illinois House minority leader Jim Durkin, whom he was able to beat, ensuring his return to the Senate.

Durbin won re-election to a second term easily, carrying a majority of the states 102 counties.

Iowa 

Incumbent Democrat Tom Harkin won re-election to a fourth term. Harkin was opposed in the general election by United States Congressman Greg Ganske, who fought off a surprisingly difficult challenger in the Republican primary. Though Harkin had narrowly defeated his opponent six years earlier, he was able to defeat Ganske by a fairly comfortable margin to win re-election.

Kansas 

Incumbent Pat Roberts won re-election to a second term easily because no Democrat filed to run.

Kentucky 

Incumbent Republican Mitch McConnell won re-election to a fourth term.

Louisiana 

Incumbent Democrat Mary Landrieu won re-election to a second term.

During the run-off, Landrieu was out-spent three-to-one by Republican contender Suzanne Haik Terrell, the Louisiana Elections Commissioner. Terrell also had prominent Republicans including President George W. Bush and Vice President Dick Cheney visit Louisiana to campaign on her behalf. Republicans, confident of victory having gained seats in the elections to the House of Representatives and to the Senate, solidifying control of the former and taking control of the latter, publicly called the election "Operation Icing on the Cake". Some Democrats responded by calling their efforts "Operation Wipe that Smirk off of Bush's Face" and dubbed Landrieu's subsequent run-off victory, "Operation Pie in the Face".

Landrieu pulled off what many considered to be an upset victory. The Republicans believed they would most likely win the race. Before the election many Republicans called the race operation icing on the cake. After Landrieu won the runoff Democrats dubbed her victory operation pie in the face. The race was close. In terms of rural parishes the vote was split fairly evenly. Landrieu did well in Caddo Parish home of Shreveport, and in East Baton Rouge Parish home of East Baton Rouge. Ultimately though it was Landrieu's huge win in Orleans Parish home of New Orleans that pushed her over the finish line. Haik Terrell conceded defeat to Landrieu at 12:38 P.M. EST, congratulating Landrieu on her victory. Landrieu would go on to be re-elected to a third term in 2008.

Maine 

Incumbent Republican Susan Collins won re-election to a second term.

Chellie Pingree, State Senator and Senate Majority Leader attacked Collins for supporting the Bush tax cuts. Both candidates opposed the Iraq War in the fall of 2002. However, Collins then supported the congressional resolution to attack Iraq, while Pingree opposed it.

Collins, a popular moderate, was supported by health care groups, environmentalists and gay rights advocates. She handily defeated State Senator Chellie Pingree of North Haven in one of the few U.S. Senate elections in which both major parties nominated women in U.S. history.

Massachusetts 

Incumbent Democrat John Kerry won re-election to a fourth term against Libertarian Michael Cloud. The lack of a Republican party candidate caused Cloud to receive the largest percentage of votes for a U.S. Senate candidate in the Libertarian Party's history, though this record has since been eclipsed by Joe Miller in Alaska in 2016, and again by Ricky Dale Harrington in Arkansas in 2020.

Michigan 

Incumbent Democrat Carl Levin won re-election to a fifth term.

Minnesota 

Incumbent Democrat Paul Wellstone was running for re-election to a third term, but died in a plane crash eleven days before the election. The Democratic–Farmer–Labor Party (DFL) chose former Vice President and 1984 Presidential candidate Walter Mondale to replace Wellstone on the ballot. Mondale lost to Republican Mayor of Saint Paul Norm Coleman. The day before the election, Independence Governor Jesse Ventura had appointed Dean Barkley (IP) to serve the rest of Wellstone's term. , this was the last Senate election in Minnesota won by a Republican.

In the primaries, Paul Wellstone defeated Dick Franson 93% to 5% and Norm Coleman defeated Jack Shepard 95% to 5%.

At the time of his death, Wellstone was slightly ahead in the polls. After Walter Mondale was chosen as the DFL candidate, in a poll taken a few days before the election Mondale was leading 51% to 45%. Early on Election Day, Mondale was leading in votes. By nightfall, however, Norm Coleman pulled ahead, winning by 49.5 percent to 47.3 percent.

Paul Wellstone still appeared on the ballot despite his death, despite a court order replacing Wellstone's name with Mondale's.

Mississippi 

Incumbent Republican Thad Cochran overwhelmingly won re-election to a fifth term. The Democratic Party did not field a candidate, resulting in Reform Party candidate Shawn O'Hara winning 15.42% of the vote.

Missouri (special) 

In the 2000 election, Mel Carnahan, who had died in a plane crash three weeks before, remained on the ballot for election to the Senate. Carnahan beat his Republican opponent, John Ashcroft, who did not legally contest being defeated by a dead candidate. Carnahan's successor as governor, Roger B. Wilson, fulfilled his pre-election promise to appoint Carnahan's widow in her husband's place and a special election was scheduled for 2002.

The election would decide who would serve the rest of Senator-elect Mel Carnahan's term, after he died. The winner would serve four more years until the next election in 2006. Governor Roger Wilson had appointed Carnahan's widow Jean to serve temporarily. She then ran for the remainder of the term. Republican Jim Talent defeated her narrowly. While the race would have flipped control of the Senate from the Democrats to the Republicans, the Senate was adjourned, so no change in leadership occurred until the 108th Congress began in January 2003.

National security and Carnahan's vote against fellow Missourian John Ashcroft as attorney general were major issues in the campaign. Republicans argued Carnahan owed her vote to Ashcroft, who had lost his bid for re-election to the Senate to Carnahan's husband. Talent, citing Carnahan's votes against homeland-security legislation and missile defense, accused her of being soft on national security, which she objected to, saying he was "doubt[ing] her patriotism."

Jack Abramoff contributed $2,000 to Talent's 2002 senatorial campaign, and Preston Gates & Ellis, a former Abramoff employer, had also contributed $1,000 to Talent's campaign. Talent later returned both contributions. Talent's win returned Republican control of the Senate which had been under slight Democratic dominance resulting from Vermont junior senator Jim Jeffords's decision to renounce the Republican Party, turning independent and making the choice to caucus with the Democrats.

Talent's victory was certified November 21, 2002, one day before Congress adjourned, which prevented Republicans from claiming a senate majority. He automatically became a Senator the following day because, under federal law, he formally took office as soon as special election results were certified and the day after both chambers of Congress adjourned. Because Republicans would hold the majority in the following Congress, they saw no need to hold a special session in the 107th to take advantage of their brief majority.

Montana 

Incumbent Democrat Max Baucus won re-election to a fifth term.

The election got national attention when Baucus's opponent, state senator Mike Taylor, accused Baucus of having implied that Taylor was gay in a campaign ad. The ad was paid for by the Democratic Senatorial Campaign Committee, though designed by the Baucus campaign. The ad, which alleged that Taylor had embezzled funds from the cosmetology school he once owned, showed footage from the early 1980s of Taylor massaging another man's face while wearing a tight suit with an open shirt. Due to financial shortages making it impossible for him to continue the race and having concerns about the effect the race was having on his family, Taylor dropped out of the race and Baucus won with 63 percent of the vote.

Nebraska 

Incumbent Republican Chuck Hagel won re-election to a second term.

New Hampshire 

Incumbent Republican/Independent U.S. Senator Bob Smith was defeated in the Republican primary and denied renomination. Republican John E. Sununu won the open seat. As of 2017, this is the last time a Republican has won the Class 2 Senate seat in New Hampshire.

Senator Bob Smith, the incumbent Republican Senator, briefly left the party in 1999 to run for president as an independent, claiming that the Republican platform was "not worth the paper it's written on". He rejoined the GOP a few months later, saying he made a mistake. Nonetheless, the party never fully forgave him, and some of his fellow Republican Senators went so far as to endorse his primary opponent, Rep. John Sununu, who would go on to win by 8 points.

During the campaign, there was a major scandal that involved the use of a telemarketing firm hired by that state's Republican Party (NHGOP) for election tampering. The GOP Marketplace, based in Northern Virginia, jammed another phone bank being used by the state Democratic Party and the firefighters' union for efforts to turn out voters on behalf of New Hampshire Governor Jeanne Shaheen on Election Day. The tampering involved using a call center to jam the phone lines of a Get Out the Vote (GOTV) operation. In the end, 900 calls were made for 45 minutes of disruption to the Democratic-leaning call centers. In addition to criminal prosecutions, disclosures in the case came from a civil suit filed by the state's Democratic Party against the state's Republican Party (now settled). Four of those involved were convicted of, or pleaded guilty to, federal crimes and sentenced to prison for their involvement . One conviction was reversed by an appeals court, a decision prosecutors appealed. James Tobin, the defendant freed on appeal, was later indicted on charges of lying to the FBI during the original investigation.

New Jersey 

The race was to originally feature Democrat Robert Torricelli, who was running for a second term in the seat he had won when former Senator Bill Bradley elected not to run for a fourth term in 1996 and who had been the state's senior Senator following Frank Lautenberg's retirement at the end of the 106th United States Congress, against former West Windsor Township mayor Douglas Forrester, who had won the Republican nomination.

Torricelli, however, had been the target of an ethics probe and eventually dropped out of the race on September 30 due to ethical concerns and poor poll numbers against Forrester, a relatively unknown opponent. The New Jersey Democratic Party convinced the retired Lautenberg to join the race after Torricelli dropped out. In the case of The New Jersey Democratic Party v. Samson, 175 N.J. 178 (2002), Forrester sued to stop Democratic Party efforts to have Lautenberg replace Torricelli. The New Jersey Supreme Court ruled unanimously on October 2 that the party could switch Lautenberg's name in for Sen. Torricelli's on the ballot. Forrester received the endorsement of President George W. Bush.

In the general election, Lautenberg defeated Forrester and became the state's junior Senator for the second time when he was sworn in on January 3, 2003 (Bradley, elected in 1978, was the senior Senator during Lautenberg's first fourteen years in office and Jon Corzine, who was elected to Lautenberg's old Senate seat, became the senior Senator in 2003 as Lautenberg's previous eighteen years in the Senate were not counted towards seniority.

New Mexico 

Incumbent Republican Pete Domenici won re-election to a sixth term. As of 2022, this is the last Senate election in New Mexico won by a Republican.

North Carolina 

Incumbent Republican Jesse Helms decided to retire due to health issues. Republican Elizabeth Dole won the open seat over Democrat Erskine Bowles, former White House Chief of Staff.

Oklahoma 

Incumbent Republican Jim Inhofe won re-election to a second term over Democrat David Walters, a former Governor of the state.

Oregon 

Incumbent Republican Gordon Smith ran for re-election to a second term. Smith, who had only served one term in the U.S. Senate, had a popularity rating slightly lower than 50% before the summer of 2002 began. Oregon Secretary of State Bill Bradbury emerged as the Democratic nominee, and though a competitive gubernatorial election occurred at the same time, Bradbury's campaign was never able to gain traction and Smith overwhelmingly won re-election. As of 2022, this is the last Senate election in Oregon won by a Republican.

Rhode Island 

Incumbent Democrat Jack Reed won re-election to a second term. Reed was an extremely popular senator, with a May Brown University poll showing the incumbent with a 73% approval rating, higher than any other elected lawmaker in the state. Reed's best performance was in Providence County, where he won with over 80% of the vote over Republican Robert Tingle, casino pit boss and nominee for RI-02 in 2000

South Carolina 

Long-time Incumbent Strom Thurmond decided to retire at the age of 100, becoming the first Centenarian to ever serve in Congress, and at that time was the longest serving Senator in U.S. history (a record later surpassed by West Virginia's Robert Byrd). Republican Lindsey Graham won the open seat.

Alex Sanders, the former president of the College of Charleston, entered the race and faced no opposition from South Carolina Democrats, thereby avoiding a primary election.

Representative Lindsey Graham had no challenge for the Republican nomination and thus avoided a primary election. This was due in large part because the South Carolina Republicans were preoccupied with the gubernatorial race and also because potential rivals were deterred by the huge financial war chest Graham had amassed early in the campaign.

The election campaign between Graham and Sanders was bitterly fought. Graham campaigned that he had a consistent conservative voting record that he claimed closely matched that of outgoing Senator Strom Thurmond. Sanders campaigned on his membership in the NAACP, the Sons of Confederate Veterans, and the NRA. He said that he was against the death penalty for religious reasons, supported abortion rights, and supported greater government involvement in education. Graham attacked Sanders for these positions consistently throughout the campaign, and Sanders hit back at Graham for wanting to privatize Social Security. Graham won the election by slightly over 10 percent.

South Dakota 

Incumbent Democrat Tim Johnson won re-election to a second term by a margin of 524 votes, defeated Republican incumbent U.S. Representative John Thune.

Thune, who was considered a rising star in his party, ran against Tim Johnson, who narrowly won his first senate election in 1996. Thune launched a television advertising campaign mentioning al Qaeda and Saddam Hussein, controversially contending that both were seeking nuclear weapons and that the country needed a missile defense system, something Johnson voted against 29 times and that Thune supported. Johnson attacked Thune for politicizing national security. President George W. Bush campaigned for Thune in late October. More than $20 million was spent in the election. Both candidates had raised over $5 million each.

Johnson narrowly prevailed over Thune by a mere 524 votes. Despite the extreme closeness of the election, Thune did not contest the results and conceded defeat on the late afternoon of November 9. Johnson's narrow victory may be attributed to his strong support in Oglala Lakota County. Thune also underperformed in typically Republican areas. Johnson was sworn in for a second term on January 3, 2003. Thune would later be elected to the other Senate seat in 2004, defeating Minority Leader Tom Daschle. He would then serve with Johnson in 2005.

Tennessee 

Incumbent Republican Fred Thompson decided to retire. Republican Lamar Alexander, former U.S. Secretary of Education and former Governor of Tennessee, won the open seat over Democrat Bob Clement, U.S. Representative.

Alexander raised $2 million through June 2002. Clement attacked the Governor for his corporate connections and business dealings. By October, Clement had nearly raised $900,000, while Alexander raised almost $3 million. Bush, who had a 60% approval rating in the state, helped campaign and raise money for Alexander. Alexander was also endorsed by the NRA.

Texas 

Incumbent Republican Phil Gramm decided to retire instead of seeking a fourth term. Republican John Cornyn won the open seat over the Democratic Mayor of Dallas, Ron Kirk.

Despite the fact that Texas is a red state, Kirk ran on a socially progressive platform: supporting abortion rights and opposing Bush judicial nominee Priscilla Owen, although Kirk was a former George W. Bush supporter. He also supported increases in defense spending, such as Bush's proposed $48 billion increase in military spending, except for the money Bush wanted to use for missile defense. Kirk had the support of former Governor Ann Richards and former U.S. Senator Lloyd Bentsen.

Cornyn was criticized for taking campaign money from Enron and other controversial companies.

The race was perceived as close, with an October Dallas Morning News poll showing Cornyn leading 47% to 37%. However, Cornyn won election by 12 percent. A record $18 million was spent in the election.

Virginia 

Incumbent Republican John Warner won re-election to a fifth term, making him one of only three Virginia U.S. Senators to serve five or more terms. No Democrat ran against Warner, and he won every single county and city in the state with at least 60% of the vote. As of 2022, this is the last Senate election in Virginia won by a Republican.

West Virginia 

Incumbent Democrat Jay Rockefeller won re-election to a fourth term over Republican State Senator Jay Wolfe.

Rockefeller was the heavy favorite, with one poll showed him leading 72% to 17%. Rockefeller had $2.9 million cash on hand to Wolfe at $100,536 (In mid-October). Wolfe was endorsed by President George W. Bush and the National Rifle Association, but it wasn't enough to make the election competitive. Rockefeller won by a margin of over 25 percent.

Wyoming 

Incumbent Republican Mike Enzi won re-election to a second term.

Enzi stated that his top priorities were education, jobs, national security and retirement security. He had $485,000 cash on hand in June 2002, when Joyce Corcoran (D), Mayor of Lander first filed.

See also 
 2002 United States elections
 2002 United States gubernatorial elections
 2002 United States House of Representatives elections
 107th United States Congress
 108th United States Congress

Notes

References 
 Robert M. Sanders; "How Environmentally-Friendly Candidates Fared in the Congressional Elections of 2002: A Time of Green Anxiety?" International Social Science Review, Vol. 79, 2004
 Elections Division from the Louisiana Secretary of State
 2002 Massachusetts state-wide election results

External links
 Clerk of the House of Representatives – Statistics of the Congressional Election of November 5, 2002
 United States Election 2002 Web Archive from the U.S. Library of Congress